Memories of the Alhambra is a 2018 South Korean television series, starring Hyun Bin and Park Shin-hye. Primarily set in Spain (and in South Korea in later episodes), the series centers on a company CEO and a hostel owner who get entangled in a series of mysterious incidents surrounding a new and intricate augmented reality game inspired by the stories of the Alhambra Palace. It aired on cable network tvN from December 1, 2018, to January 20, 2019, every Saturday and Sunday at 21:00 (KST). It is also available for online streaming on Netflix.

The drama is one of the highest-rated Korean dramas in cable television history, and was praised for its creative plot and its unexpected twists. Its title also alludes to Francisco Tárrega's eponymous classical guitar piece Recuerdos de la Alhambra, which is also a part of the series' soundtrack.

Synopsis
After receiving an email regarding a groundbreaking AR game about medieval battles in the Alhambra, Yoo Jin-woo (Hyun Bin), CEO of an investment company that specializes in optical devices, travels to Granada, Spain to meet the creator of the game, Jung Se-joo (Park Chan-yeol). However, Se-joo has gone missing and there, Jin-woo meets Se-joo’s older sister, Jung Hee-joo (Park Shin-hye), who is the owner of the hostel he stays in and a former guitarist. Both get entangled in mysterious incidents, as the border between the real world and the AR world built by Se-joo begins to blur.

Cast

Main
 Hyun Bin as Yoo Jin-woo
 CEO of investment company called J One Holdings and Doctor of Engineering, who is talented at developing games. He is fearless, adventurous and cynical. His AR game ID is "zinu" and he is the highest-level player in the game.
 Park Shin-hye as Jung Hee-joo / Emma
  as young Jung Hee-joo
 Jung Hee-joo: Owner of Hostal Bonita. A former classic guitarist who came to Spain for further studies, but took on several jobs there to sustain livelihood following the death of her parents. She has artistic sensibility but zero financial sense.
 Emma: An NPC character in the AR game created by Se-joo based on Hee-joo.

Supporting

People around Jung Hee-joo
 Park Chanyeol as Jung Se-joo
 Kim Jun-eui as young Jung Se-joo
 Hee-joo's younger brother. A genius reclusive programmer who develops an intricate augmented reality game. It is later revealed that, after killing Marco, he is forced into hiding in the Instance Dungeon until Jin-woo freed him. His AR game ID is "master".
 Kim Yong-rim as Oh Young-shim
 Hee-joo's caring grandmother.
 Lee Re as Jung Min-joo
 Park Chae-hee as young Jung Min-joo
 Hee-joo's younger sister. She dreams of becoming a girl group member.
 Lee Hak-joo as Kim Sang-bum
 A classic guitarist and international student in Spain. He is close to Hee-joo and cares for her, but often oversteps his boundaries.

People around Yoo Jin-woo
 Park Hoon as Cha Hyung-seok
 The CEO of IT company Neword and Doctor of Engineering. Jin-woo's college friend and co-founder of J One Holdings, who later betrayed him and became his biggest rival. His AR game ID is "Mr. Cha".
 Lee Seung-joon as Park Seon-ho
 The Business Strategy Director and co-founder of J One Holdings, who is Jin-woo's college senior. He is later promoted to CEO of J One Holdings.
 Min Jin-woong as Seo Jung-hoon
 Jin-woo's loyal secretary. He was killed by NPCs created by the bug due to being Jin-woo's ally. His AR game ID is "City Hunter".
 Cho Hyun-chul as Choi Yang-joo
 The Head of R&D Center Research Team of J One Holdings. He creates special game weapons for Jin-woo to help him defeat NPCs created by the bug, and survive.
 Lee Si-won as Lee Soo-jin
 Jin-woo's first ex-wife; Hyung-seok's current wife who is pregnant. A pediatrician.
 Kim Eui-sung as Cha Byung-jun
 The selfish and greedy Professor of Business Administration at a university in Seoul, who is also Hyung-seok's father. He is later killed by NPCs created by the bug in his attempt to indirectly cause Jin-woo's death by restarting the game.
  as Lee Soo-kyung
 Soo-jin's younger sister, who is a florist.

Others
 Han Bo-reum as Ko Yoo-ra
 Jin-woo's second ex-wife, who is an extremely vain and impulsive celebrity with a drinking habit.
 Lee Jae-wook as Marco Han
 A programmer and hacker who is affiliated with Se-joo. He was accidentally killed by Se-joo due to a bug caused by their physical contact while duelling. His AR game ID is "marco".
  as Noh Young-jun
 Yoo-ra's manager and ex-boyfriend.

Special appearances
 Park Hae-soo as A (Ep. 1, 2, 4, 8)
 A detective who collects intelligence for Jin-woo.
  as Hee-joo's father (Ep. 3)
  as Hee-joo's mother (Ep. 3)
 Han Da-sol as Gamer (Ep. 3)
 An international student.
 Kim Hyun-mok as J One Employee (Ep. 7, 10, 16)
  as Entertainment News Program Reporter (Ep. 7, 16)
  as Live Weekly News Host who reported on Cha Hyung-suk's death
  as Live Weekly News Reporter who reported on Cha Hyung-suk's death

Production
The series is helmed by director Ahn Gil-ho, who directed Stranger and writer Song Jae-jung whose previous works include W and Queen In-hyun's Man.

Touted as Korea's first augmented reality-gaming drama, Memories of the Alhambra was revealed to be inspired by tech mogul Elon Musk and the Pokémon Go game.

The first script reading took place in May 2018.

Overseas filming took place in several cities in Andalucía and Catalonia, such as Granada (Andalucía),  and Barcelona and Girona (some interiors and exteriors) and Terrassa (exteriors and film studios) in Catalonia from late May to June. In early August, the cast started filming in Budapest, Hungary and Slovenia. The script for the last episode was completed on December 19, 2018 and filming wrapped up on December 29, 2018 in South Korea.

A preview screening event was held at CGV theaters on November 28, 2018 prior to the airing of the first episode.

Original soundtrack

Part 1

Part 2

Part 3

Part 4

Part 5

Part 6

Reception
Memories of the Alhambra was a commercial success, consistently topping the cable television viewership ratings in its timeslot. Its 14th episode recorded a 10.025% nationwide audience share according to Nielsen paid platform, making it as one of the highest rated in Korean cable television history.

The drama has attracted attention for its unique theme of augmented reality; and earned praise for its high-end computer graphics, cinematography and fast-paced storytelling. Critic Jeong Seok-hee praised the drama for its mysterious and captivating plot that held viewers' attention until the very end, and that it "has the potential to become one of the very best TV dramas we have seen in years". However, later on it received criticism for its confusing development and slow development of plot, and its excessive product placement.

According to the Korean Foundation for International Cultural Exchange, the series is receiving favorable reviews and popularity in China for its actors' performance, cinematography and fresh story.

Viewership

Awards and nominations

International broadcast
 Memories of the Alhambra was broadcast on Netflix in Asia and English-speaking territories an hour after its broadcast in Korea. In Japan, the drama was broadcast on December 2, while in Europe, South America and the rest of the world, it was launched starting December 11.

References

External links
  
 Memories of the Alhambra at Studio Dragon 
 Memories of the Alhambra at Chorokbaem Media 
 
 
 

2018 South Korean television series debuts
TVN (South Korean TV channel) television dramas
South Korean fantasy television series
South Korean suspense television series
South Korean science fiction television series
Television shows written by Song Jae-jung
Television series by Studio Dragon
Television series by Chorokbaem Media
2019 South Korean television series endings
Television shows set in Andalusia
Television shows set in Hungary
Television shows set in Slovenia
Television shows set in South Korea
Korean-language Netflix exclusive international distribution programming